The Hollow Crown may refer to:

 a passage in Shakespeare's play Richard II
 The Hollow Crown (anthology), a 1961 work by John Barton
 The Hollow Crown (TV series), a BBC adaptation of Shakespeare plays
 Hollow Crown, a 2009 album by British metalcore band Architects
 Dan Jones' The Wars of the Roses: The Fall of the Plantagenets and the Rise of the Tudors, New York, Viking, 2014, ; also published as The Hollow Crown: The Wars of the Roses and the Rise of the Tudors, London, 2014, .